Sam Wallman is an Australian comics journalist, political cartoonist and editor based in Melbourne, Victoria. He is actively involved in the trade union movement, having previously been a union delegate, and an employee of the National Union of Workers.

In 2014, the team behind his viral comic At Work In Our Detention Centres: A Guard's Story was nominated for a Walkley Award, and won the Australian Human Rights Award in the Print and Online Media category. In 2016, his long-form comic essays Winding Up The Window: The End of Australia's Auto Industry and Brick by Brick: Is This Europe were nominated for Walkley Awards.

He was shortlisted for the 2023 Victorian Premier's Prize for Nonfiction for Our Members Be Unlimited: A Comic about Workers and Their Unions.

References 

Australian cartoonists
Living people
Year of birth missing (living people)